Horncastle was a rural district in  Parts of Lindsey, Lincolnshire, England, from 1894 to 1974.

It was formed under the Local Government Act 1894 from the Horncastle Rural Sanitary District. It entirely surrounded the town of Horncastle, which was an urban district, and also surrounded Woodhall Spa on three sides.

The rural district was abolished under the Local Government Act 1972 and merged with other districts to form the district of East Lindsey.

References
 Horncastle RD, A Vision of Britain Through Time.

Rural districts of Lindsey
Districts of England created by the Local Government Act 1894
Districts of England abolished by the Local Government Act 1972